Bruno Dominix Hortelano Roig (born 18 September 1991) is a Spanish athlete competing in sprinting events.

Early life and career
Hortelano was born to Spanish parents in Wollongong, Australia where his father was completing a PhD. After the family moved to Canada in 1992, Hortelano was raised in Burlington, Ontario. His sport interests varied from taekwondo, soccer and, in high school, American football. He was a member of the Burlington Track Club and also competed at high school venues initially contesting the 100m and later the 110m hurdles. From 2005 to 2009 he attended Assumption Catholic Secondary School. He was twice named the most valuable sprinter. Hortelano was a finalist in the 100m at 10.76 in the 2009 OFSSA Provincial Championships, Toronto. That fall Hortelano was enrolled at Cornell University in Ithaca, New York where he competed in the Ivy League; a genetics major, he graduated in 2014.

He represented Spain in the 200 metres at the 2013 World Championships reaching the semifinals after setting a new Spanish record of 20.47 in the heats. At the 2016 European Championships he won the gold medal after setting a new Spanish record of 20.39 in the semifinals. Later in 2016, at the Summer Olympics in Rio, Hortelano again broke his own national record in the Men's 200 m with a time of 20.12, but failed to qualify for the final.

On September 5, 2016 Hortelano suffered a "catastrophic hand injury" in a drunk driving car accident in Madrid, but made a full recovery with the exception of partial use of his right hand and in 2018 he established a new national record in the 200 and 400 metres.

International competitions

Personal bests
Outdoor
100 metres – 10.06 (+1.0 m/s, Madrid 2016; NR)
200 metres – 20.04 (+0.8 m/s, Getafe 2018; NR)
400 metres – 44.69 (Madrid 2018; NR)
Indoor
60 metres – 6.63 (Portland 2016)
200 metres – 20.75 (Albuquerque 2014)
400 metres – 47.04 (Hanover, New Hampshire 2014)

References

1991 births
Living people
Cornell Big Red men's track and field athletes
Spanish male sprinters
Athletes (track and field) at the 2016 Summer Olympics
European Championships (multi-sport event) bronze medalists
European Athletics Championships medalists
Olympic athletes of Spain
World Athletics Championships athletes for Spain
Sportspeople from Wollongong
Citizens of Spain through descent